Joaquín "Ximo" Miralles Sanz (born 14 April 1996) is a Spanish footballer who plays as a goalkeeper for UD Logroñés.

Club career
Born in Vinaròs, Valencian Community, Miralles joined Villarreal CF's youth setup in 2005. In 2015, he became Spanish National Champion with Villarreal CF Juvenil A winning the ¨Copa de Campeones¨ and captaining a unique generation of current professional players such as Rodrigo Hernandez from Manchester City. He made his senior debut with the C-team on 5 September 2015, starting in a 0–0 Tercera División home draw against Muro CF. 

On 3 July 2016, after being a regular starter, Miralles moved abroad after signing a full scholarship deal with Clemson University, joining their soccer side Clemson Tigers. At Clemson, Miralles finished his first season as #1 seed in the RPI rankings and making it to the ACC Final and NCAA National Tournament Quarter Finals, falling against Denver University. On 24 April of the following year, he signed for Premier Development League side Fresno Fuego FC, but after two weeks he moved to Lane United FC where he played nine matches. 

In January 2018, after finishing his degree in economics and ending his second season for the Clemson Tigers, Miralles returned to Villarreal and its C-side. On 12 July of that year, he signed a one-year contract with AD Alcorcón in Segunda División, being initially assigned to the reserves also in the fourth division.

On 16 November 2019, as both Dani Jiménez and Samu Casado were injured, Miralles made his professional debut by starting in a 1–0 home defeat of Málaga CF. The following 2 September, he agreed to a two-year deal with CD Numancia in the third division.

References

External links
 
 
 

1996 births
Living people
People from Vinaròs
Sportspeople from the Province of Castellón
Spanish footballers
Footballers from the Valencian Community
Association football goalkeepers
Segunda División players
Tercera División players
Villarreal CF C players
AD Alcorcón B players
AD Alcorcón footballers
CD Numancia players
Clemson Tigers men's soccer players
Fresno Fuego players
Lane United FC players
Spanish expatriate footballers
Spanish expatriates in the United States
Expatriate soccer players in the United States